Khairpur Nathan Shah is a city and taluka of Dadu District in the Sindh province of Pakistan.

References

Populated places in Dadu District